Nikola Ignjatijević (Serbian Cyrillic: Никола Игњатијевић; born 12 December 1983) is a Serbian footballer who plays as left back, most recently for Rad.

Club career

Red Star Belgrade
Nikola signed with his former youth club in 2009. On 16 July 2009 he made his European dream debut against NK Rudar Velenje. Red Star won 1-0 .On 15 August 2009 he made his SuperLiga debut for Red Star against FK Jagodina at Stadion FK Jagodina in 3-0 won. He assisted Slavko Perović on 12 December 2009, even on his birthday, in 5-2 won against FK Spartak Subotica. He scored his first goal for Red Star in 1-0 win against FK Jagodina on 27 February 2010. Ignjatijević scored again for Red Star next week against FK Rad in 2-1 away won. He scored the winning goal like last week.

Loan to Politehnica Timișoara
On 17 January 2011 Ignjatijević was loaned out at Romanian giants FC Politehnica Timișoara. He signed a contract until the summer with option to buy him from Red Star at end of the season. He was presented on press conference along his new-team mates Sergei Lepmets, Sorin Ghionea and Andrei Zăgrean and he said: "I came to a very ambitious club, very well organized, eager for success and in next 6 months we expect victories to win Liga 1". On 16 June 2011 his contract expired and he returned to Red Star Belgrade after making a good impression in Liga 1.

Zorya
In 2012, Red Star was in the process of rebuilding the entire team and Ignjatijević transferred to Zorya Luhansk. He immediately made an impact in the team, consistently having a spot in Zorya's starting XI.

References

External links

Nikola Ignjatijević Biography and Stats on Liga1 homepage 
Nikola Ignjatijević Stats at Utakmica.rs

1983 births
Living people
Sportspeople from Požarevac
Serbian footballers
Association football defenders
Serbian expatriate footballers
FK Jedinstvo Ub players
FK Javor Ivanjica players
FK Zemun players
FK Napredak Kruševac players
Red Star Belgrade footballers
FC Politehnica Timișoara players
FC Zorya Luhansk players
Serbian SuperLiga players
Liga I players
FK Radnički Niš players
OFK Beograd players
FC Shakhtyor Soligorsk players
FK Borac Čačak players
Ukrainian Premier League players
Expatriate footballers in Romania
Expatriate footballers in Ukraine
Expatriate footballers in Belarus
FK Rad players